Thampanoor Ravi (Malayalam:തമ്പാനൂര്‍ രവി; born 26 November 1949, in Thiruvananthapuram, Kerala) is an Indian politician belonging to the Indian National Congress party and former Kerala MLA representing the Neyyattinkara constituency of Thiruvananthapuram, Kerala, India. He represented the Neyyattinkara constituency in the Kerala Legislative Assembly for three terms (1991–96, 1996–2001, and 2001–06).

Early life
Thampanoor Ravi was born to S. Sekhara Pillai and B. Saraswathy Amma in Thiruvananthapuram on 26 November 1949. He completed his Bachelor of Arts degree and married T. Jayakumari, with whom he has one son and one daughter. He lives near Sasthamangalam, Thiruvananthapuram.

Political life

Thampanoor Ravi was elected to the Kerala Legislative Assembly for the first time in 1991 from the Neyyattinkara constituency representing the Congress party. Prior to his victory, the constituency had been a stronghold of the Left Democratic Front. He was re-elected during the 1996 and 2001 elections and thus represented the constituency for a period of 15 years in the Kerala Legislative Assembly.

Other Positions Held and details

 Member:  K.S.E.B Board of Directors, K.S.F.E., Kerala State Transport Advisory Committee, Kerala Sports Council
 Member:  All India Congress Committee since 1991
 President:  Youth Congress, Trivandrum District
 Member:  INTUC National Council
 State General Secretary:  INTUC
 Vice President:  Thiruvananthapuram DCC
 Executive Member:  Trivandurm Development Authority.

References

1949 births
Living people
Members of the Kerala Legislative Assembly
Politicians from Thiruvananthapuram
Indian National Congress politicians from Kerala